Sünlük can refer to:

 Sünlük, Kargı
 Sünlük, Mustafakemalpaşa